Beauty on Parade is a 1950 American drama film directed by Lew Landers and starring Robert Hutton, Ruth Warrick and Lola Albright.

Synopsis
Having given up her own dreams of beauty queen stardom twenty years earlier to get married, a mother channels her ambitions through her young daughter who win a local competition and is entered into a national contest.

Main cast
 Robert Hutton as Gil McRoberts 
 Ruth Warrick as Marian Medford 
 Lola Albright as Kay Woodstock 
 John Ridgely as Jeffrey Woodstock 
 Hillary Brooke as Gloria Barton 
 Wally Vernon as Sam Short 
 Jimmy Lloyd as Johnny Fennell 
 Donna Gibson as Mona Booker 
 Frank Sully as Murph 
 Robert C. Hasha as Walker 
 Lillian Bronson as Mrs. Enfield-Hyphen-Hatch

References

Bibliography
 Bernard F. Dick. Columbia Pictures: Portrait of a Studio. University Press of Kentucky, 2015.

External links
 

1950 films
1950 drama films
American drama films
Films directed by Lew Landers
Columbia Pictures films
American black-and-white films
Films about beauty pageants
1950s English-language films
1950s American films